Panfocaccia is a kind of bread that is very similar to focaccia in Italian cuisine. It's well known in several other countries; there are different panfocaccia throughout Italy's regions, and it is also made by the Italian diaspora throughout the rest of the world.

See also
 

Italian breads